Şehit Osman Altınkuyu Anatolian High School is a four-year Anatolian High School located in Yalova, Turkey. It is the first Anatolian High School of Yalova Province. The primary language of instruction is Turkish. The secondary foreign languages are German and English.

See also
 List of high schools in Turkey

References
 Şehit Osman Altınkuyu Anadolu Lisesi Official Website - Brief History of Şehit Osman Altınkuyu Anadolu Lisesi

External links
 Şehit Osman Altınkuyu Anadolu Lisesi Official Website

High schools in Yalova
Educational institutions established in 1994
Buildings and structures in Yalova
Buildings and structures in Yalova Province
1994 establishments in Turkey
Anatolian High Schools